Indiana University East (IU East or IUE) is a public university in Richmond, Indiana, a regional campus of Indiana University that serves the eastern Indiana and western Ohio area. Established in 1971 by the Indiana University Board of Trustees, IU East enrolls over 4,000 students on its five-building, 174-acre campus and in online classes. IU East has 60 academic degree programs, offering bachelor's and master's degree programs and certificates in areas of Business and Economics, Education, Humanities and Social Sciences, Natural Science & Mathematics, Informatics, General Studies, Nursing and Health Sciences, and Social Work.

History

Indiana University East grew out of an extension established at Earlham College that was operated cooperatively by Earlham and Indiana University. In 1967, the arrangement was expanded to include Purdue and Ball State Universities and the extension became the Eastern Indiana Center of Earlham College.

In 1969, Richmond citizens formed Eastern Indiana Community College, Inc., to raise funds for the construction of a new campus. After raising more than $1 million, members of the community college organization, with the consent of the four educational institutions involved in the center, asked Indiana University to establish a regional campus in Richmond and to assume responsibility for the operation.

The Indiana General Assembly approved this plan, and on July 1, 1971, the Eastern Indiana Center of Earlham College became Indiana University East, the sixth campus in the Indiana University regional system. On October 3, 1972, ground was broken at the new campus site north of Richmond. The first building, an all-purpose academic facility, was completed in late 1974 and dedicated February 23, 1975. IU East earned its first accreditation in 1975.

The Indiana University East campus included 225 acres (0.911 km²) of land, purchased with community donations, on the northern edge of Richmond, Indiana. Of those ,  are for IU East and 51 acres (0.21 km²) are for other non-IU East post-secondary educational uses, such as Ivy Tech Community College.

Whitewater Hall opened in 1976 as the first of five buildings. This was followed by Hayes Hall in 1992, Middlefork Hall in 1995 (renamed Tom Raper Hall in 2009), Springwood Hall in 1999 and the Student Events and Activities Center in 2016.

Additionally, the IU East Henry County Danielson Learning Center in New Castle, Indiana was dedicated in May 1999 to serve the citizens of Henry County, Indiana. IU East offers degree programs off-campus at the Ivy Tech Community College in Lawrenceburg Riverfront Campus.

Recent chancellors include David Fulton, Nassar Paydar, Larry Richards (interim), and Kathryn Cruz-Uribe (current).

Since awarding its first bachelor's degrees in 1977, IU East has expanded its academic portfolio to include 60 bachelor's degree options and selected master's degrees. In 2017, IU East conferred its 10,000th degree.

Academics
IU East is both a traditional campus and a virtual campus with select online degree completion programs.

IU East offers over 60 degree programs at the bachelor's and master's degree levels. Forty-eight of these are conferred through Indiana University, whereas six are conferred through Purdue University.

Academic schools
Indiana University East is organized into seven schools:
 School of Business and Economics
The School of Business and Economics at Indiana University East hosts the following areas of academic study: Accounting, Finance, Business Administration, Marketing, and Management Information Services and is accredited by the Association of Collegiate Business Schools and Programs (ACBSP). On-campus programs offered by the school include a Bachelor of Science in Business Administration with concentrations in Accounting (CPA or Managerial tracks), Finance, and Management Information Systems, minors in Economics and Entrepreneurship, undergraduate certificates in Fundamental Business and International Business, and a post-baccalaureate certificate in General Business. In addition to on-campus courses and programs, the School of Business & Economics offers a degree completion program leading to a Bachelor of Science in Business Administration in cooperation with Ivy Tech Community College at the Ivy Tech Riverfront Campus in Lawrenceburg, IN, as well as online. The online degree completion program, several introductory courses in Business and Economics, and the concentration in Finance are available through IUEverywhere, the online division of Indiana University East.
 School of Education
The School of Education at Indiana University East is accredited by the NCATE, and hosts the following areas of academic study: Elementary Education, Secondary Education with specialization in English, Social Studies, and Science as well as Master of Science in Education.
 School of Humanities & Social Sciences
The School of Humanities and Social Sciences at Indiana University East hosts the following areas of academic study: Anthropology, Communication Studies, Criminal Justice, Fine Arts, World Languages and Cultures, Women's & Gender Studies, Geography, History, Humanities, Music, Philosophy, Political Science, Psychology, Religious Studies, Sociology, Theater and the Department of English. In addition to on-campus courses and programs, the School of Humanities & Social Sciences offers online degree completion programs available through IUEverywhere. Two programs are available: a Bachelor of Arts in Communication Studies and a Bachelor of Arts in English (Technical and Professional Writing).
 School of Natural Science & Mathematics
The School of Natural Science & Mathematics at Indiana University East hosts the following areas of academic study: Biology, Biotechnology, Chemistry, Earth Sciences, Mathematics, and Physics.
 School of Nursing and Health Sciences
 School of Social Work

Special programs
 Honors Program
 Award-winning Supplemental Instruction (SI)
 Internships
 Service-Learning
 Study Abroad

Purdue Polytechnic Richmond
Indiana University East hosts a branch of Purdue Polytechnic Richmond. Certificates and degrees for the following programs at IU East are awarded by Purdue Polytechnic Richmond:
 Computer Graphics Technology (B.S., A.S.)
 Engineering Technology (B.S)
 Industrial Technology (B.S., Certificate)
 Mechanical Engineering Technology (A.S.)
 Organizational Leadership and Supervision (B.S., A.S., Certificate)

Athletics
The Indiana–East (IUE or IU East) athletic teams are called the Red Wolves (formerly known as the "Pioneers"). The university is a member of the National Association of Intercollegiate Athletics (NAIA), primarily competing in the River States Conference (RSC; formerly known as the Kentucky Intercollegiate Athletic Conference (KIAC) until after the 2015–16 school year) since the 2007–08 academic year (when the school began its athletic program and joined the NAIA).

IU East competes in 16 intercollegiate varsity sports: Men's sports include basketball, cross country, golf, soccer, tennis and track & field (indoor and outdoor); while women's sports include basketball, cross country, golf, soccer, tennis, track & field (indoor and outdoor) and volleyball; and co-ed sports include eSports.

Campus
IU East's campus lies on  (0.704 km²) of land on the northern edge of Richmond, Indiana, near Interstate 70. IU East, Ivy Tech, and Earlham College are the immediate area's largest colleges. IU East has five academic buildings, Springwood, Whitewater, Tom Raper, Hayes Halls and the Student Events and Activities Center, with more planned over coming years. There are no student housing dormitories on campus.

Whitewater Hall hosts Vivian Auditorium, the Campus Bookstore, and the Offices of Admissions, Financial Aid, Bursar and Registrar, English Department, The School of Natural Science and Mathematics, administration, and the Den, the campuses cafe. Hayes Hall opened in 1992 and houses the Campus Library, Information Technology, School of Nursing, School of Business and Economics, Center for Teaching & Learning, and Center for Health Promotion. Middlefork Hall houses the School of Humanities and Social Sciences including the art studios, the School of Education, School of Social Work and the Purdue University College of Technology programs. Middlefork Hall was renamed to Tom Raper Hall, in honor of a prominent donor. Springwood Hall is home to the Office of the Chancellor, the athletics program, Office of External Affairs, Campus Life office, Music program and studios, lastly the Graf Recreation Center. The Graf Recreation Center contains a coffee bar, Brewfus, a weight facility, and half-court basketball gym.

IU East campus is adjacent to another public college, the Richmond campus of the Ivy Tech Community College system. IU East also houses the Purdue University College of Technology's statewide presence in Richmond.

Notable faculty
 Alisa Clapp-Itnyre, Professor of English and author of Angelic Airs, Subversive Songs: Music as Social Discourse in the Victorian Novel (Ohio UP, 2002) and British Hymn Books for Children, 1800-1900: Re-Tuning the History of Childhood (Routledge, 2016); Principal Investigator for Sounding Childhood website soundingchildhood.org; Director of the Honors Program, 2010-2018.
 Jean Harper - Associate Professor of English, documentary, 1:47, and nonfiction writer, author of award-winning memoir Rose City: A Memoir of Work. National Endowment for the Arts Fellow (Prose, 2012).
 T.J. Rivard - Professor of English, Associate Vice-Chancellor of Academic Affairs and author.
 Ron Itnyre, Ph.D.--Lecturer in Biology; Chair of the Sustainability Council
 Joanne Passet - Retired—Professor of U.S. History and Dean of the School of Humanities and Social Sciences, a Fulbright scholar in Vietnam, researcher of U.S. Women's History.
 Mary Fell - Retired—Professor of English, Chair of English Department and poet.
 Catherine Ludlum Foos - Retired—Associate Professor of Philosophy, Associate Dean of the School of Humanities and Social Sciences, and researcher.
 Paul Kriese - Retired—Professor of Political Science, a member of Organizing for America for President Barack Obama, American Democracy Project

References

External links
 Official website
 Official athletics website

East
Public universities and colleges in Indiana
Educational institutions established in 1971
Buildings and structures in Richmond, Indiana
Distance education institutions based in the United States
Education in Richmond, Indiana
River States Conference
1971 establishments in Indiana